Thomas Boylston Adams may refer to:
Thomas Boylston Adams (1772–1832), Massachusetts legislator and judge and brother of John Quincy Adams
Thomas Boylston Adams (1910–1997), Massachusetts executive, writer, and political candidate